Suwayd ibn Amr al-Khath'ami (Arabic: سُوَیْد بْن عَمْرو الخَثْعَمی) was the last martyr of Karbala.

Lineage 
Suwayd ibn Amr ibn Abi Muta' al-Khath'ami was a nobleman from the Khath'am tribe. He was known as a pious man and a skillful and brave warrior.

On the day of Ashura 
Suwayd was the last person from Husayn ibn Ali's army who went to the battlefield. He fought bravely against Yazid's army until he was severely injured and fell down among other martyrs, where he was left for dead. However, Suwayd was still alive, and at some point heard people say that Husayn had been killed. With great effort, he got back on his feet and continued to fight until he was martyred. It is said that Urwa ibn Battan al-Tha'labi and Zayd ibn Riqad al-Janbi killed him.

References 

Hussainiya
Husayn ibn Ali
600s births
Year of birth uncertain
680 deaths

People killed at the Battle of Karbala